The  is a railway line operated by the private railway operator Nagoya Railroad (Meitetsu) in Aichi Prefecture, Japan, connecting Shin Anjō and Kira Yoshida. It originally included a branch from Nishio-guchi to Okazaki-shin on the Tokaido Main Line, which closed in 1962 (see History section below).

Stations

●：Stop　▲：Partial stop　｜：Pass

History

The Nishio Railway opened the Okazaki-shin to (old) Nishio section in 1911 as a  gauge line, and extended it to Kira Yoshida between 1915 and 1916. In 1926, the line was acquired by the Aichi Electric Railway, which between 1928 and 1929 converted the line to  gauge, electrified it at 600 V DC, and connected to the line from Shin Anjō (see below) at Nishio-guchi, abandoning the 762 mm gauge section between there and Kami Yokosuka. That company merged with Meitetsu in 1935.

In the meantime, the Hekikai Electric Railway opened the Shin Anjō to Yonezu section, electrified at 1,500 V DC, in 1926, and extended the line to Nishio in 1928, with a connection to Kami Yokosuka opening in 1930. The company merged with Meitetsu in 1944.

The section from Nishio-guchi to Okazaki-shin was closed between 1959 and 1962, with the voltage on the Nishio to Kira Yoshida section being raised to 1,500 V DC in 1960.

Former connecting lines
 Minami Anjo Station: The Hekikai Electric Railway  opened a 1 km 1,067 mm gauge freight-only line electrified at 1,500 V DC to Anjo in 1939. The company merged with Meitetsu in 1944, which commenced passenger services in 1950. The line closed in 1961.
 Nishio Station: The Nishio Railway opened a 5 km 762 mm gauge line to Heisaka Port in 1914. Following the company merging with Aichi Electric Railway Co. in 1926, the line was converted to 1,067 mm gauge and electrified at 600 V DC in 1928. The line closed in 1960 when the Nishio line voltage was increased to 1,500 V DC.

See also
 List of railway lines in Japan

References

This article incorporates material from the corresponding article in the Japanese Wikipedia.

Nishio Line
Rail transport in Aichi Prefecture
Railway lines opened in 1928
1067 mm gauge railways in Japan